16th Division or 16th Infantry Division may refer to:

Infantry divisions 

 16th Division (German Empire), a unit of the Prussian/German Army
 16th Reserve Division (German Empire), a unit of the Imperial German Army in World War I
 16th Infantry Division (Wehrmacht), of the German Army was created in 1934 as Kommandant von Münster
 16th Mechanized Infantry Division (Greece), a major mechanized infantry formation of the Hellenic Army
 16th Indian Division, British Indian Army during World War I
 16th Division (Imperial Japanese Army), an infantry division in the Imperial Japanese Army
 16th Infantry Division (Poland), a military unit of the Polish Army
 16th Rifle Division (Soviet Union), a formation in the Red Army created during the Second World War
 16th Division (Spain), a unit of the Spanish Republican Army during the Spanish Civil War
 16th (Irish) Division, a voluntary 'Service' division of Kitchener's New Army raised in Ireland from the 'National Volunteers', initially in September 1914, after the outbreak of the Great War
 16th Division, National Guard division established in early 1917 consisting of Ohio and West Virginia; later 37th Infantry Division
 16th Division (United States), short-lived World War I division, established in 1918 and disbanded in March 1919

Armoured/cavalry divisions 
 16th Motorised Division Pistoia (Kingdom of Italy)
 16th Guards Cavalry Division (Soviet Union)
 16th Armored Division (United States), an armored division of the United States Army in World War II
 16th Armored Division of Qazvin

See also 
 16th Army (disambiguation)
 16th Wing (disambiguation)
 16th Group (disambiguation)
 16th Regiment (disambiguation)
 16th Brigade (disambiguation)
 16th Squadron (disambiguation)